Akkadian or Accadian may refer to:

 Akkadians, inhabitants of the Akkadian Empire
 Akkadian language, an extinct Eastern Semitic language
 Akkadian literature, literature in this language
 Akkadian cuneiform, early writing system
 Akkadian mythology, early Mesopotamian religion

See also 
 Acadian (disambiguation)
 Akadia (disambiguation)
 Akkad (disambiguation)

Language and nationality disambiguation pages